The National Agency for Information Society (AKSHI)  is an institution of the Albanian Government under the direct supervision of the Prime Minister's Office. AKSHI's mission is to coordinate the development and administration of state information systems and promote the development of Information Society in Albania.

Following the 2009 Parliamentary Elections, one of the main objectives of the government program for 2009-2013 was "Albania in the Digital Age". The Minister for Innovation, Information Technology and Communication at the time was tasked with running the process of digitalization. New legislation was adopted in line with EU standards which made possible the creation of a digitalized National Civil Registry, an Electronic Procurement System, the Tax Service had been provided electronically since 2008 and Customs Declarations also started being conducted electronically.

AKSHI developed and administers the e-Albania portal which serves as a gateway through which any interested citizen can access via electronic means services provided by public institutions in Albania.

References

 
AKSHI